The Cabinet of Igor Matovič was a Government of the Slovak Republic led by Prime Minister Igor Matovič. It was formed on 21 March 2020, following the 2020 parliamentary election as a coalition of four partiesOrdinary People and Independent Personalities, We Are Family, Freedom and Solidarity and For the People.

It was approved by the National Council on 30 April 2020 with a 93–48 vote.

The coalition crisis in March 2021 led to resignation of Igor Matovič and his government on 30 March 2021. Matovič's Cabinet was replaced on 1 April 2021 by the Cabinet of Eduard Heger, who was the Minister of Finance in Matovič's Cabinet.

Composition

(SaS) SaS nominee(WaF) We Are Family nominee(OĽaNO) OĽANO nominee

Notes

References

External links
 Website of the Slovak Government

Government of Slovakia
Cabinets established in 2020
Freedom and Solidarity
Slovak government cabinets
2020 establishments in Slovakia
2021 disestablishments in Slovakia